Gunsmoke: One Man's Justice  is a 1994 American Western television film based on the Gunsmoke series (1955–1975) starring James Arness. It is the fifth and final film.

Plot
After robbing a train of $30,000, Irish outlaw Sean Devlin and his bandits interrupt their get-away to rob a stagecoach. While defending the coach, Matt's son-in-law Josh is shot in the leg, a traveling barbed wire salesman Davis Healy is hit in the arm, while a widowed mother of two, Hannah Miller, is mortally wounded. Three passing cowboys intercede and chase the Devlin gang off. The stage stops at Dillon's ranch to help the wounded since it is closer than town.

Hannah dies at Matt's ranch house. Her eldest boy Lucas (age 15) sneaks away in the middle of the night to seek revenge with his father's gun belt and deputy's badge. In the morning, Matt heads out after the boy to try to keep him from being killed. Healy, despite his wound, insists on joining the pursuit, causing Matt to question Healy's motives.

Meanwhile back on the ranch, the younger orphaned boy Martin has been left in Beth's care, but he refuses to eat or speak. Beth tries to coax him out of mourning.

Trivia
During the film it is revealed that just like Lucas, Matt's father was also killed in the line of duty as a lawman, specifically a Texas Ranger. This detail was never mentioned in the entire 20-year course of the television series.

Cast

 James Arness as Matt Dillon
 Bruce Boxleitner as Davis Healy
 Amy Stock-Poynton as Beth Reardon
 Alan Scarfe as Sean Devlin
 Christopher Bradley as Josh Reardon
 Mikey LeBeau as Martin Miller 

Introducing:
 Kelly Morgan as Lucas Miller

Co-starring:
 Apesanahkwat as Six Eyes
 Hallie Foote as Hannah Miller
 Clark Brolly as Jesse

Featuring:
 Don Collier as Sheriff (Dillion Ranch)
 Ed Adams as Waco
 Wayne Anthony as Hotel Clerk
 Bing Blenman as Hardcase
 Tom Brinson as Potter
 Dave Adams as Sam the Cook
 Sandy Gibbonsas Sheriff Deke Clamber
 Mike Kevil as Bobby
 Richard Lundin as Stage Driver
 Kyle Marsh as Cathy
 Jonathan Mincks as Fred (Bandit)
 Billy Joe Patton as Grady (Dillion Ranch Hand)
 Ric San Nicholas as Al
 Forrie J. Smith as Donny
 Robin Wayne as Henry

Reception
The film received lukewarm reviews but ranked sixth in its time-slot, with a 11.5/17 rating/share, and 35th out of 85 programs airing that week. It completed against five other shows which had higher Nielsen Ratings for its 8-10 PM time-slot: NBC's Seinfeld (4th at 22.0/32), Frasier (6th at 21.1/31), Wings (10th at 18.0/27), and Mad About You (17th at 15.4/23), and FOX's The Simpsons (25th at 13.3/20).

References

External links
 
 
 Gunsmoke: One Man's Justice at INSP.com

1994 television films
1994 films
1990s American films
1990s English-language films
1994 Western (genre) films
American Western (genre) television films
Gunsmoke
Films based on television series
CBS network films
American sequel films
Television sequel films
Films scored by Artie Kane